KRUI (1490 AM) is a radio station broadcasting a Classic Hits format. Licensed to Ruidoso Downs, New Mexico, United States, the station is currently owned by the Village of Ruidoso New Mexico.

History
The station was assigned the call letters KOAW on 1982-11-17. On 1989-03-01, the station changed its call sign to the current KRUI.

References

External links
1490 The Mountain Facebook

RUI
News and talk radio stations in the United States